Rodger Morris Ward (January 10, 1921 – July 5, 2004) was a World War II P-38 aviator in the United States Army Air Forces, and an American race driver with 26 victories in top echelon open-wheel racing in North America, two Indianapolis 500 victories, and two USAC National Championships, who conceived the classic tri-oval design and layout of Pocono International Raceway, modeled after his three favorite signature turns, at Trenton, Indianapolis and Milwaukee.

Early history
Ward was born in Beloit, Kansas, the son of Ralph and Geneva (née Banta) Ward.  By 1930, the family had moved to California.  He died in Anaheim, California.

Ward's father owned an auto wrecking business in Los Angeles. Rodger was 14 years old when he built a Ford hot rod. He was a P-38 Lightning fighter pilot in World War II. He enjoyed flying so much he thought of making it his career. He began to fly B-17 Flying Fortress and was so good he was retained as an instructor. After the war he was stationed in Wichita Falls, Texas when a quarter mile dirt track was built.

Midget car racing
He began racing midget cars in 1946 after he was discharged from the Army. He finished poorly. His skills improved in 1947 and by 1948 he won the San Diego Grand Prix. He raced in an Offenhauser in 1949 and won several races.

Ward shocked the midget car racing world when he broke Offenhauser motor's long winning streak by using Vic Edelbrock's Ford 60 "shaker" motor at Gilmore Stadium on August 10, 1950. The motor was one of the first to feature nitromethane for fuel. Ward and Edelbrock went to the Orange Show Stadium the following night and won again. Ward drove Ken Brenn's Offy midget July 25,1959 to beat the top expensive and exotic sports cars in a Formula Libre race at Lime Rock Park. Midget cars were normally considered competitive for oval tracks only before that time. Later that year, Ward entered the United States Grand Prix for Formula One cars with the midget car, under the false belief that it was much quicker through the turns, a fact he found not true at the beginning of practice. He eventually retired from the race after twenty laps with a mechanical failure.

Championship cars
He won the 1951 AAA Stock Car (later USAC Stock Car) championship. The championship gave him an opportunity for a rookie test at the 1951 Indianapolis 500. He passed the test and qualified for the race. He finished 34 laps before his car suffered a broken oil line. He finished 130 laps in the 1952 Indianapolis 500 before the oil pressure failed. His 1953 Indianapolis 500 ended after 170 laps, and his 1954 Indianapolis 500 ended after his car stalled on the backstretch. He completed all of the laps for the first time in 1956, finishing eighth.

In 1959 he joined the Leader Card Racers team with owner Bob Wilke and mechanic A. J. Watson;  forming what was known as the "3 W's". Ward won his first Indianapolis 500. He won the USAC National Championship with victories at Milwaukee, DuQuoin and the Indy Fairgrounds. His 1959 season ended by competing in the only United States Grand Prix held at Sebring Raceway.

Ward battled Jim Rathmann for the lead in the 1960 Indianapolis 500. In one of the epic duels in Indy 500 history, Ward and Rathmann exchanged the lead 14 times before Ward slowed on lap 197 to nurse his frayed right front tire to the finish. Rathmann, also struggling with worn-out tires after such a furious pace, took the lead on lap 197 and the two drivers limped home in what is still regarded as one of the greatest duels for the win in Indianapolis 500 history.

Ward took the lead at the 1962 Indianapolis 500 at lap 126 and led the rest of the race. He also won the season championship that year.

In the midst of the Lotus-Ford rear-engine invasion in 1964, car owner/chief mechanic A.J. Watson built the first rear-engined Watson, mated to the four-cam Ford. But the night before the 1964 Indianapolis 500, Ward and Watson made a highly uncharacteristic strategic error. Going against the strong recommendation (read: orders) from Ford to use gasoline fuel instead of the cooler-burning but more powerful methanol/gasoline. The car was fast, but the jetting mistake left Ward having to pit every 20 laps for fuel. Later Ward calculated that he had spent two minutes less on the track than winner A.J. Foyt, yet only lost the race by approximately 1 minute.

In addition, the horrific second-lap accident, in which his friends Dave MacDonald and Eddie Sachs both perished in a fiery, gasoline-fueled wreck, left an indelible impression on Ward. After a difficult month of May, 1965, Ward suffered the embarrassment of failing to qualify. Ward left the Leader Card team mid-season and joined Mecom Racing team owned by John W. Mecom Jr. In 1966 Ward won the second race of the season at Trenton driving a supercharged Offy powered Lola.
For his Indianapolis 500 effort Ward drove the same car but retired while running 15th with handling problems listed as the cause. The fact that late race attrition reduced the race to only five cars would have provided him a good finish as long as he was running and in fact he had been faster than the winner. Ward had parked a running car 74 laps into the race and was considering his future. At the banquet, Ward stood at the podium and made a painful announcement to the crowd: "I always said I'd quit racing when it stopped being fun," he said. He paused as he wiped away tears. "Today it wasn't fun anymore." He had 26 victories in his 150 starts between 1950 and 1966, and he finished in the top ten in more than half of his starts.

After retirement

Ward retired to be a commentator for ABC's Wide World of Sports for NASCAR and Indycars from 1965 to 1970. From 1980-1985, he served as a driver expert for the Indianapolis Motor Speedway Radio Network, before retiring in Tustin, California. With the help of the Mattioli Family, Ward helped design the Pocono Raceway in Long Pond, Pennsylvania. A unique course that resulted in a triangle shape, he designed the track after three corners of tracks he liked to race at, Trenton, Indianapolis, and Milwaukee. The track is still popular today. 

In later years, he served as public relations director for the new Ontario Motor Speedway, and later managed the Circus Circus unlimited hydroplane team. He died on July 5, 2004, aged 83.

Awards
In 1992, he was inducted into the International Motorsports Hall of Fame.
He was inducted in the Motorsports Hall of Fame of America in 1995.
Ward was inducted in the National Midget Auto Racing Hall of Fame in 1995.
Ward is a member of the Indianapolis Motor Speedway Hall of Fame.
He was inducted in the West Coast Stock Car Hall of Fame in 2003.

Complete AAA/USAC Championship Car results

Indianapolis 500 results

Ward's finishes from 1959 to 1963 and 1960 to 1964 rank as the best and second best five-race finishing streaks in Indianapolis 500 history.

World Championship career summary
The Indianapolis 500 was part of the FIA World Championship from 1950 through 1960. Drivers competing at Indy during those years were credited with World Championship points and participation. Rodger Ward participated in 12 World Championship races, including 10 starts at Indy along with the 1959 United States Grand Prix and the 1963 United States Grand Prix. He won 1 race and finished on the podium twice. He accumulated a total of 14 championship points.

Complete Formula One World Championship results
(key)

References

External links
The Greatest 33

1921 births
2004 deaths
American Formula One drivers
American World War II fighter pilots
Reg Parnell Racing Formula One drivers
Champ Car champions
Champ Car drivers
Indianapolis 500 drivers
Indianapolis 500 winners
International Motorsports Hall of Fame inductees
Motorsport announcers
People from Beloit, Kansas
Racing drivers from Kansas
AAA Championship Car drivers
World Sportscar Championship drivers
United States Army Air Forces pilots of World War II
United States Army Air Forces officers
Formula One race winners
USAC Stock Car drivers
Carrera Panamericana drivers